Tinker Field was an outdoor baseball stadium in Orlando, Florida, United States. Named after Baseball Hall of Famer Joe Tinker, it was located in the West Lakes neighborhoods of Downtown Orlando, adjacent to the Camping World Stadium and one mile west of the Amway Center. In April 2015 the City of Orlando tore down the grandstands and removed all other extant buildings.

Constructed in 1914, Tinker Field was the spring training home of the Brooklyn Dodgers, Cincinnati Reds, Washington Senators, and Minnesota Twins. It was also the home park of the Orlando Rays minor league baseball team before they moved to Cracker Jack Stadium in 2000. It was located directly adjacent to the western side of the Orlando Citrus Bowl Stadium and boasted a capacity of 5,100 before the grandstands were removed in 2015.

History
The field first saw use for baseball in 1914; the first known stadium built on the site was in 1923. It was all-wood construction and seated 1,500. For the next 10 years, the Cincinnati Reds would call Tinker Field their spring training home til 1933. The Brooklyn Dodgers trained there in 1934 and 1935. In 1936 Clark Griffith moved the Washington Senators to Orlando, where the Washington Senators/Minnesota Twins would train until after the 1990 season. The stadium was rebuilt again in 1963, and when Griffith Stadium in Washington, D.C., was demolished, nearly 1,000 of the stadium's seats were moved to Tinker Field. The remaining seats were sold by the City of Orlando in 2015. The old press box next to the home side dugout was the original press box and can be seen in photographs as early as the 1920s.

Tinker Field was added to the United States National Register of Historic Places in 2004. One of the most historical non-baseball events to take place at Tinker Field was a visit from Dr. Martin Luther King Jr. on March 6, 1964. He spoke before thousands of people from the pitcher's mound in his only public speech in the city.

On January 28, 2014, during the groundbreaking of the Orlando Citrus Bowl Stadium reconstruction, it was announced that the grandstands and all other extant buildings surrounding Tinker Field would be torn down. The reasons cited were that the expansion of the Orlando Citrus Bowl Stadium would shorten right field so much that it would make it unusable even if it the entire building complex was renovated. On March 9, 2015, Orlando City Council approved an ordinance to demolish the grandstands and buildings, and allocated money to re-create the area surrounding the field.

In September, 2015, the City of Orlando held a public input meeting and unveiled preliminary plans to memorialize Tinker Field. Tinker Field History Plaza opened in May 2018, memorializing civil rights and baseball in Orlando.

Present
Each November, Tinker Field hosts the Electric Daisy Carnival—a three-day festival that features electronic dance music with celebrity DJs, visual effects, rides, and art.

On September 6, 2015, Tinker Field was the site of West Lakes Family Fun Day—an event held by members of the neighborhoods surrounding the field prior to the MEAC/SWAC Challenge.

Each June or July, Tinker Field hosted the Orlando Vans Warped Tour—a one-day festival that features rock music with popular bands from around the world.

Gallery

References

External links

 Orange County listings at National Register of Historic Places
 Tinker Baseball Field at Orlando: A Visual History
 Tinker Field Views – Ball Parks of the Minor Leagues 
 Ballpark Reviews: Tinker Field
 Spring Training Online: Tinker Field

Brooklyn Dodgers spring training venues
Cincinnati Reds spring training venues
Grapefruit League venues
Minor league baseball venues
Minnesota Twins spring training venues
National Register of Historic Places in Orange County, Florida
Sports venues in Orlando, Florida
Washington Senators (1901–1960) stadiums
Baseball venues in Florida
Sports venues on the National Register of Historic Places in Florida
1914 establishments in Florida
Defunct baseball venues in the United States
Defunct minor league baseball venues
2015 disestablishments in Florida
Sports venues completed in 1914
Sports venues demolished in 2015